Everything Louder is the tenth studio album by the English heavy metal band Raven, released in 1997.

Track listing

Personnel
John Gallagher - bass, vocals
Mark Gallagher - guitar
Joe Hasselvander - drums

References

1997 albums
Raven (British band) albums
SPV/Steamhammer albums